{{Automatic taxobox
| taxon = Macteola
| image = Macteola segesta 001.jpg
| image_caption = Shells of Macteola interrupta (museum specimen at MNHN, Paris)
| authority = Hedley, 1918
| synonyms_ref = 
| synonyms =
| type_species = Purpura (Cronia) anomala Angas, 1877
| subdivision_ranks = Species
| subdivision = See text
| display_parents = 3
}}Macteola is a genus of sea snails, marine gastropod mollusks in the family Mangeliidae.

Description
This name is proposed for a genus of the Mangiliinae, in which the aperture has not acquired armature, and in which the lip is not flexed. Prominent radial ribs are over-ridden by fine beaded spiral threads. The apex is mucronate (i.e. with a small pointed projection, or spine-like ending),  with smooth whorls. Characteristic is a colour scheme of a peripheral zone of brown or black or orange, sometimes broken into a series of dots or clashes.

Species
Species within the genus Macteola include:
 Macteola anomala (Angas, 1877)
 Macteola biconica Stahlschmidt, Poppe & Tagaro, 2015
 Macteola chinoi Stahlschmidt, Fraussen & Kilburn, 2012
 Macteola interrupta (Reeve, 1846)
 Macteola miresculpta (Bozzetti, 2020)
 Macteola theskela (Melvill & Standen, 1895)
Species brought into synonymy
 Macteola bella W.H. Pease, 1860: synonym of Macteola interrupta  (L.A. Reeve, 1846)
 Macteola cinctura C. Hedley, 1922: synonym of Macteola segesta cinctura  C. Hedley, 1922
 Macteola gemmulata G.P. Deshayes, 1863: synonym of Macteola interrupta  (L.A. Reeve, 1846)
 Macteola sandersonae (Bucknill, 1927): synonym of Neoguraleus sandersonae  (Bucknill, 1927)
 Macteola segesta (Duclos, 1850): synonym of Macteola interrupta'' (Reeve, 1846)

References

External links
 Hedley, 1918;  A checklist of the marine fauna of New South Wales. Part 1.; Journal of the Royal Society of New South Wales, supplement to vol. 51: 79, 82
 Bouchet, P.; Kantor, Y. I.; Sysoev, A.; Puillandre, N. (2011). A new operational classification of the Conoidea. Journal of Molluscan Studies. 77, 273-308
  Tucker, J.K. 2004 Catalog of recent and fossil turrids (Mollusca: Gastropoda). Zootaxa 682:1-1295.
 Worldwide Mollusk Data base : Mangeliidae
 MNHN: Macteola sp.